Antioch is the name of the following places in the U.S. state of Indiana:
Antioch, Clinton County, Indiana
Antioch, Greene County, Indiana
Antioch, Jay County, Indiana
Antioch, Switzerland County, Indiana